Wabern railway station or Wabern station may refer to:

 Wabern bei Bern railway station, in the Swiss canton of Bern
 Wabern station (Hesse), in the German state of Hesse